The Caples–Ringling Estates Historic District (also known as the John Ringling Estate, the Charles Ringling Estate, and the Ralph Caples Estate) is a U.S. historic district (designated as such on December 15, 1982) located in Sarasota, Florida. The district is bounded by the Sarasota Bay, US 41, Parkview and North Shore Avenue. It contains 18 historic buildings and 5 structures.

Gallery

References

External links

 Sarasota County listings at National Register of Historic Places

National Register of Historic Places in Sarasota County, Florida
Historic districts on the National Register of Historic Places in Florida
Buildings and structures in Sarasota, Florida